"Explanation" is a poem from Wallace Stevens's first book of poetry, Harmonium (1923). It was first published  in 1917, so it is in the public domain.

Interpretation
Robert Buttel has indicated this poem may be an explanation of the difference between conventional decoration and artistic imagination, the latter represented, as Buttel proposes, by an allusion to Chagall and the otherworldly charm (a figure drifting through space) of his paintings.

Notes

References 

 Buttel, Robert. Wallace Stevens: The Making of Harmonium. 1967:  Princeton University Press.

1917 poems
American poems
Poetry by Wallace Stevens